Siyatha FMis a radio channel based in Colombo, Sri Lanka. It is owned by Voice of Asia (Private) Ltd., which also runs its sister television channel Siyatha TV. Siyatha FM is available on 98.2 MHz, 98.4 MHz Islandwide in Sri Lanka.

Siyatha FM was also the Exclusive Broadcaster for the ICC T20 Cricket World Cup 2014

See also
 List of radio networks in Sri Lanka

References

External links
 The official website of Siyatha FM

Sinhala-language radio stations in Sri Lanka
Voice of Asia Network
Mass media in Colombo